Central Chidlom is a large department store located in Bangkok, Thailand.
It is the flagship store of the Central Group. The store has a total of seven floors and sells many luxury products. It is accessible by either BTS Skytrain or several city buses.

History 
In 1973, Central Group opened Central Chidlom on an area of over seven rai (2.76758 acres) with an investment budget of 80 million baht (US$2,477,164.00) under the concept of " One Stop Shopping ". It is the first branch that sells products in all departments. including imported products from all over the world At first, The mall was built with only four floors.

1995 fire damage 
On November 22, 1995, Central Chidlom was caught fire due to a short circuit. The fire was burning in the building for more than 24 hours. The damage was not less than 1,535 million baht (US$47,543.83). Expensive products. and documents were lost to the fire. This caused the headquarters to be moved to CentralPlaza Ladprao.

After the fire and the building fell apart Central decided to build a new building. The mall was then renovated and reopened again in 1998. The fire was caused due to short circuit in the building, However it is widely theorized that the fire was caused by a group of people that was angry at Central Group which they decided to seek revenge by burning the building.

Location 
Central Chidlom is located in Pathum Wan District on Chit Lom road

Facilities

Anchors

Main anchors 
 Central Department Store

Key tenants 
SuperSports – A large sporting equipment shop.
PowerBuy – Thai electronics store
B2S Think Space – Book and stationary store
Tops Food Hall – This premium-level supermarket offers household products, fresh fruits and vegetables, dairy products, butcheries and seafood. There are also a wine cellar, a food court and a variety of restaurants and fast food outlets.
Lofter – Thai food court on Floor 7

External links 
 

Department stores of Thailand
Pathum Wan district
Central Group
1973 establishments in Thailand
Buildings and structures in Bangkok